Reeuwijk-Brug is a village in the municipality of Bodegraven-Reeuwijk in the province of South Holland, the Netherlands.

Reeuwijk-Brug is a stretched out peat excavation village from the Middle Ages which was later developed from Reeuwijk-Dorp. The Dutch Reformed church is a neoclassic aisleless church from 1863 which was built as a replacement of the 16th century church. The former town hall with bell tower was built in 1918.

Gallery

References 

Bodegraven-Reeuwijk
Populated places in South Holland